Events in the year 1946 in Bulgaria.

Incumbents 
Monarch – Simeon II (until September 15)
Regency council
Acting President – Vasil Kolarov (after September 15)

Events 

 8 September – A referendum was held in Bulgaria on whether to become a republic. The result were unanimously in favour of the change, with 95.6% supporting and with 91.7% voter turnout.

Sports

References 

 
1940s in Bulgaria
Years of the 20th century in Bulgaria
Bulgaria
Bulgaria